Paul Beraldo (born October 5, 1967) is a retired Italian-Canadian professional ice hockey centre. He was selected 139th overall in the 1986 NHL Entry Draft by the Boston Bruins. He played ten games for the Bruins during the 1987–88 and 1988–89 seasons.

Beraldo has also played for both the Canadian and the Italian national ice hockey teams.

Playing career
Beraldo was born in Hamilton, Ontario. Having been selected by the Boston Bruins in the 1986 NHL Entry Draft, Beraldo was assigned to play for their farm team, the Maine Mariners, in the American Hockey League (AHL) during the 1987–88 season. He played for Maine in the AHL for three seasons, during which time he stepped up to play for Boston in the National Hockey League (NHL) three times during the 1987–88 season and seven times during the 1988–89 season, although he failed to score any points during these games.

After the 1989–90 season, Beraldo signed with HC Milano Saima in the Italian Serie A, where he helped them to win the league in 1991. The following season, he stayed with Milano Saima, playing in Serie A and the international Alpenliga. Staying in Milan, he continued to play in Serie A and the Alpenliga the following season, 1992–93, with HC Lion Milano.

Leaving Italy for Germany in the 1993–94 season, Beraldo played for Berliner SC Preussen in what turned out to be the final season of the old German first division. He returned to Italy at the end of the season to play three games for SG Milano Saima in the Italian playoffs. After one game with Milano Saima at the start of the 1994–95 season, he returned to Germany to play for TuS Geretsried in the German second division. He then finished the season back in North America playing for Brantford Smoke in the Colonial Hockey League.

Returning to Germany for the 1995–96 season, Beraldo played for four teams over the next three seasons in the Deutsche Eishockey Liga (DEL) – EC Ratingen Löwen, Adler Mannheim (winning the league with them in 1996–97), Kassel Huskies and Star Bulls Rosenheim. He joined HC Fribourg-Gottéron in the Swiss Nationalliga A for the 1998–99 season, during which time he also appeared for them in the International Ice Hockey Federation's European Hockey League.

After sitting out the 1999–00 season, Beraldo moved onto his fourth European country when he joined up with the Sheffield Steelers in the United Kingdom for the 2000–01 Ice Hockey Superleague (ISL) season. Finishing his ice hockey career on a high, Beraldo helped Sheffield to a Grand Slam of the Benson & Hedges Cup, Challenge Cup, league championship and playoff championship.

Honours
 Serie A champion with HC Milano Saima in 1990–91.
 DEL champion with Adler Mannheim in 1996–97.
 Benson & Hedges Cup, Challenge Cup, ISL and ISL playoff champion with the Sheffield Steelers in the 2000–01 season.

Career statistics

Regular season and playoffs

International

References
 

1967 births
Living people
Adler Mannheim players
Boston Bruins draft picks
Boston Bruins players
Brantford Smoke players
BSC Preussen Berlin players
Buffalo Stampede players
Canadian expatriate ice hockey players in England
Canadian expatriate ice hockey players in Germany
Canadian expatriate ice hockey players in Switzerland
Canadian ice hockey centres
Canadian sportspeople of Italian descent
Citizens of Italy through descent
EC Ratinger Löwen players
HC Fribourg-Gottéron players
HC Milano players
HC Milano Saima players
Ice hockey people from Ontario
Italian expatriate sportspeople in England
Italian expatriate sportspeople in Germany
Italian expatriate sportspeople in Switzerland
Italian ice hockey players
Italian people of Canadian descent
Kassel Huskies players
Maine Mariners players
Sault Ste. Marie Greyhounds players
Sheffield Steelers players
Sportspeople from Hamilton, Ontario
Starbulls Rosenheim players
TuS Geretsried players